There are 110 livery companies, comprising London's ancient and modern trade associations and guilds, almost all of which are styled the 'Worshipful Company of' their respective craft, trade or profession. These livery companies play a significant part in the life of the City of London (i.e. the financial district and historic heart of the capital), not least by providing charitable-giving and networking opportunities. Liverymen retain voting rights for the senior civic offices, such as the Lord Mayor, Sheriffs and Corporation, its ancient municipal authority with extensive local government powers.

The term livery originated in the specific form of dress worn by retainers of a nobleman and then by extension to special dress to denote status of belonging to a trade. Livery companies evolved from London's medieval guilds, becoming corporations under royal charter responsible for training in their respective trades, as well as for the regulation of aspects such as wage control, labour conditions and industry standards. Early guilds often grew out of parish fraternal organizations, where large groups of members of the same trade lived in close proximity and gathered at the same church. Like most organisations during the Middle Ages, these livery companies had close ties with the Catholic Church (before the Protestant Reformation), endowing religious establishments such as chantry chapels and churches, observing religious festivals with hosting ceremonies and well-known mystery plays.  Most livery companies retain their historical religious associations, although nowadays members are free to follow any faith or none. Companies often established a guild or meeting hall, and though they faced destruction in the Great London Fire of 1666 and during the Blitz of World War II, around forty companies still own or share ownership of halls, some elaborate and historic, others modern replacements for halls destroyed or redeveloped. Most of these halls are made available for use by other companies not having a hall of their own.

Most ancient livery companies maintain contact with their original trade or craft. In some cases, livery companies have chosen to support a replacement industry fulfilling a similar purpose today, e.g. plastics replacing use of horn or ivory. Modern companies are mainly represented by today's professions and industry and operate in close association with these. Many ancient crafts remain as relevant today as when their guilds were originally established. Some still exercise powers of regulation, inspection and enforcement, while others are awarding bodies for professional qualifications. The Scriveners' Company admits senior members of legal and associated professions, the Apothecaries' Society awards post-graduate qualifications in some medical specialities, and the Hackney Carriage Drivers' Company comprises licensed taxi drivers who have passed the "Knowledge of London" test. Several companies restrict membership to those holding relevant professional qualifications, e.g. the City of London Solicitors' Company and the Worshipful Company of Engineers. Other companies whose trade died out long ago, such as the Longbow Makers' Company, have evolved into being primarily charitable foundations.  Some companies disappeared entirely such as Pinmakers.

After the Worshipful Company of Carmen received City livery status in 1848 no new companies were established for 80 years until the Honourable Company of Master Mariners in 1926 (granted livery in 1932). Post-1926 creations are known as modern livery companies. The Worshipful Company of Arts Scholars, the newest, was granted livery status on 11 February 2014, making it the 110th City livery company in order of precedence. The Honourable Company of Air Pilots is exceptional among London's livery companies in having active overseas committees in Australia, Canada, Hong Kong, New Zealand and North America.

Purpose

Training and industry
The companies were originally formed, starting in the 12th century, to guarantee that a member was trustworthy and fully qualified, and that the goods they produced were of reputable quality, the two-fold aim being to protect the public and to protect members from charlatans. Many were formed up until the 17th century, when political upheaval and the growth of London around the City meant the companies, which only controlled trade in the City itself, began to struggle to compete.

From the 1870s however, there was a revival, with the companies extending their original educational purpose to technical education, supporting new industries and providing the training necessary to them, most notably the City and Guilds of London Institute.

Charity and education
From the start, the companies cared for their members in sickness and old age. Today, they support both their members, and wider charitable aims and activities, including those supporting education and training.

Several schools in the UK are associated with the livery companies such as Haberdashers', Merchant Taylors' and Skinners'.

Support to the armed forces
Most livery companies have affiliations with regular and reserve units in the armed forces.

City of London governance
The companies have always been essential to the governance of the City of London. The senior members of the livery companies, i.e., the liverymen, elect the city's sheriffs, Bridge Masters, Ale Conners, auditors, the members of the City Livery Committee, and approve the aldermanic candidates for election to the office of Lord Mayor of London.

Entry
Entry to a livery company may be by one of four routes:
 By invitation to become an honorary freeman. This is rare, and is considered a great honour.
 By apprenticeship or servitude. This is now rare. In earlier days, someone wishing to enter a trade would bind himself as apprentice to a member of his chosen trade. As such, he was required to do as he was instructed, and in return for strict adherence to the master's rules the apprentice learned his trade, while his master was required to provide such training that, at the end of the apprenticeship (usually seven years) the apprentice would be sufficiently knowledgeable to become a member – and a free man of the City of London – free of the obligations of apprenticeship.  
 By patrimony. Generally, a member's son (or now also a daughter) who was born after the parent became a member of a company are entitled to become a member by patrimony.
 By redemption. Redemption is the path to the Freedom for all others who do not qualify for apprenticeship, patrimony or by invitation and requires the payment of a fine (fee) as well as an interview or other admission procedure.

Regardless of method of entry, membership carries the same duties, responsibilities and benefits. Membership of a livery company may combine with the Freedom of the City of London, now little more than a formality, though in the past the freedom carried benefits, such as being able to take a flock of sheep across London Bridge at no charge.

Governance
Livery companies are governed by a master (alternatively styled prime warden in some companies, or Upper Bailiff of the Weavers' Company), a number of wardens (holding various titles such as the upper, middle, lower, or renter wardens), and a court of assistants (board of directors), responsible for company business and electing its master and wardens. The clerk to the company is invariably its most senior permanent member of staff, who as chief executive officer runs its day-to-day activities.

Membership generally falls into two categories: freemen and liverymen. One may become a freeman, or acquire the "freedom of the company", upon fulfilling certain criteria: traditionally, by "patrimony", if either parent were a liveryman of the company; by "servitude", if one has served a requisite number of years as an apprentice to a senior company member; or by "redemption", upon paying a fee. Most livery companies reserve the right to admit distinguished people, particularly in their sphere of influence, as honorary freemen. Freemen may advance to become liverymen, after obtaining the freedom of the City of London, and with their court of assistants' approval. Only liverymen are eligible to vote in the annual election of the Lord Mayor of London, the sheriffs and various other City civic offices, including the Ale Conners and Bridge Masters.

The livery companies elect a majority of the members of the Livery Committee, a body administered at Guildhall. The committee oversees the elections of sheriffs and the Lord Mayor, educates liverymen regarding the city and its activities, represents the livery companies in communications with the city.

Liverymen

A liveryman is a full member of his respective company.

When a freeman becomes a liveryman, the candidate is said to be 'enclothed': indeed, a livery gown is placed on him at the court and he is seen at the next formal or social occasion wearing it. Thereafter only the master, wardens and assistants in companies are seen wearing these at company events. The masters wear them at the city's formal events, e.g. the two Common Halls and the United Guilds Service, and Lord Mayor's Show, wherever they may participate. Ordinarily, liverymen wear ties at formal functions and each company differs by allowing women to wear distinct items subject to the occasion, such as a scarf or brooch.

Freemen are expected to advance to become liverymen by a vote of the court of the company. Liverymen no longer have any local authority franchise in the city, but retain the exclusive right of voting in the election of the Lord Mayor of the City of London (Michaelmas 'Common Hall' 29 September) and for the sheriffs (Mid-Summer 'Common Hall' 24 June) held in Guildhall as a ceremonial occasion. The votes are made by 'acclamation' subject to a challenge/demand from the floor for a ballot which would be held a week later. Any two liverymen may nominate a candidate for the Freedom of the city.

Former parliamentary election rights

Before the Reform Act 1832 the liverymen had the exclusive right to elect the four Members of Parliament (MPs) representing the city. Between 1832 and 1918 being a liveryman was one of a number of possible franchises which could qualify a parliamentary elector in the City of London constituency, as it was a preserved ancient borough franchise under the terms of the 1832 Act.

Livery halls

Today 39 out of 110 City livery companies own premises in London, as well as the Watermen and Lightermen which although not strictly a livery company, retains headquarters still in regular use. Among the earliest companies known to have had halls are the Merchant Taylors and Goldsmiths in the 14th century, and, uniquely, the kitchen and the crypt of Merchant Taylors' Hall survived both the Great Fire of London and the Blitz, the kitchen now having been in uninterrupted use for over 600 years.

Besides part of Merchant Taylors' Hall kitchens, the oldest interiors extant of a livery hall proper are those of the Worshipful Society of Apothecaries, most of the rooms of which date from 1668 to 1671; significant portions of the fabric of this building are also medieval, from the 13th-century Priory, part of which became Apothecaries' Hall. Several companies that do not have a hall of their own share office premises within the hall of another company on a semi-permanent basis, examples being the Spectacle Makers' Company, which uses part of Apothecaries' Hall, and the Worshipful Company of Shipwrights, which co-habits with the Ironmongers. Many livery halls can be hired for business and social functions, and are popular for weddings, commercial and society meetings, luncheons and dinners.

Three livery companies (the Glaziers and Painters of Glass, Launderers and Scientific Instrument Makers) share a hall in Southwark, just south of and outside the City of London, while the Worshipful Company of Gunmakers has long been based at Proof House, in the London Borough of Tower Hamlets and the Master Mariners' "hall" is an historical ship, HQS Wellington, moored on the Thames which is shared by the Scriveners' Company.  Companies without halls customarily book use of another livery hall for their formal gatherings, giving members and guests the opportunity to visit and enjoy different City livery halls by rotation.

Blue plaques throughout the City of London indicate where companies formerly had halls.  Whilst several livery companies may aspire to owning or regaining their own hall it is appreciated that any increase in the overall number of livery halls would inevitably lead to some dilution of use of the existing halls. There is also attraction in belonging to a company which is peripatetic.

Precedence
In 1515, the Court of Aldermen of the City of London settled an order of precedence for the 48 livery companies then in existence, based on those companies' contemporary economic or political power. The 12 highest-ranked companies remain known as the Great Twelve City Livery Companies. Presently, there are 110 City livery companies, all post-1515 companies being ranked by seniority of creation.

The Merchant Taylors and the Skinners have long disputed their precedence, so once a year (at Easter) they swap between sixth and seventh places. This mix-up is a favourite theory for the origin of the phrase "at sixes and sevens", as has been pointed out by at least one Master Merchant Taylor; however, it is possible that the phrase may have been coined before these two companies (Taylors and Skinners) resolved their dispute, which arose from their both receiving Charters in 1327 with no proof surviving as to which was granted first.

List of companies in order of precedence

Worshipful Company of Mercers (general merchants)
Worshipful Company of Grocers (spice merchants)
Worshipful Company of Drapers (wool and cloth merchants)
Worshipful Company of Fishmongers (sellers of fish and seafood)
Worshipful Company of Goldsmiths (bullion dealers)
Worshipful Company of Skinners (fur traders)
Worshipful Company of Merchant Taylors (tailors)
Worshipful Company of Haberdashers (clothiers in sewn and fine materials, e.g. silk and velvet)
Worshipful Company of Salters (traders of salts and chemicals)
Worshipful Company of Ironmongers
Worshipful Company of Vintners (wine merchants)
Worshipful Company of Clothworkers
Worshipful Company of Dyers
Worshipful Company of Brewers
Worshipful Company of Leathersellers
Worshipful Company of Pewterers (pewter and metal manufacturers)
Worshipful Company of Barbers (including surgeons and dentists)
Worshipful Company of Cutlers (knife, sword and utensil makers)
Worshipful Company of Bakers
Worshipful Company of Wax Chandlers (wax candle makers)
Worshipful Company of Tallow Chandlers (tallow candle makers)
Worshipful Company of Armourers and Brasiers (armour makers and brass workers)
Worshipful Company of Girdlers (belt and girdle makers)
Worshipful Company of Butchers
Worshipful Company of Saddlers
Worshipful Company of Carpenters
Worshipful Company of Cordwainers (fine leather workers and shoemakers)
Worshipful Company of Painter-Stainers
Worshipful Company of Curriers (leather dressers and tanners)
Worshipful Company of Masons (stonemasons)
Worshipful Company of Plumbers
Worshipful Company of Innholders (tavern keepers)
Worshipful Company of Founders (metal casters and melters)
Worshipful Company of Poulters (poulterers)
Worshipful Company of Cooks
Worshipful Company of Coopers (barrel and cask makers)
Worshipful Company of Tylers and Bricklayers (builders)
Worshipful Company of Bowyers (long-bow makers)
Worshipful Company of Fletchers (arrow makers)
Worshipful Company of Blacksmiths
Worshipful Company of Joiners and Ceilers (wood craftsmen)
Worshipful Company of Weavers
Worshipful Company of Woolmen
Worshipful Company of Scriveners (court scribes and notaries public)
Worshipful Company of Fruiterers
Worshipful Company of Plaisterers (plasterers)
Worshipful Company of Stationers and Newspaper Makers (journalists and publishers)
Worshipful Company of Broderers (embroiderers)
Worshipful Company of Upholders (upholsterers)
Worshipful Company of Musicians
Worshipful Company of Turners (lathe operators)
Worshipful Company of Basketmakers
Worshipful Company of Glaziers and Painters of Glass
Worshipful Company of Horners (horn workers and plasticians)
Worshipful Company of Farriers (horseshoe makers and horse veterinarians)
Worshipful Company of Paviors (road and highway pavers)
Worshipful Company of Loriners (equestrian bit, bridle and spur suppliers)
Worshipful Society of Apothecaries (physicians and pharmacists)
Worshipful Company of Shipwrights (shipbuilders and maritime professionals)
Worshipful Company of Spectacle Makers
Worshipful Company of Clockmakers
Worshipful Company of Glovers
Worshipful Company of Feltmakers (hat makers)
Worshipful Company of Framework Knitters
Worshipful Company of Needlemakers
Worshipful Company of Gardeners
Worshipful Company of Tin Plate Workers alias Wire Workers
Worshipful Company of Wheelwrights
Worshipful Company of Distillers
Worshipful Company of Pattenmakers (wooden-shoe makers)
Worshipful Company of Glass Sellers
Worshipful Company of Coachmakers and Coach Harness Makers
Worshipful Company of Gunmakers
Worshipful Company of Gold and Silver Wyre Drawers (threadmakers for military and society clothing)
Worshipful Company of Makers of Playing Cards
Worshipful Company of Fan Makers
Worshipful Company of Carmen (vehicle drivers)
Honourable Company of Master Mariners
City of London Solicitors' Company (lawyers)
Worshipful Company of Farmers
Honourable Company of Air Pilots
Worshipful Company of Tobacco Pipe Makers and Tobacco Blenders
Worshipful Company of Furniture Makers
Worshipful Company of Scientific Instrument Makers
Worshipful Company of Chartered Surveyors
Worshipful Company of Chartered Accountants in England and Wales
Worshipful Company of Chartered Secretaries and Administrators
Worshipful Company of Builders' Merchants
Worshipful Company of Launderers
Worshipful Company of Marketors
Worshipful Company of Actuaries
Worshipful Company of Insurers
Worshipful Company of Arbitrators
Worshipful Company of Engineers
Worshipful Company of Fuellers
Worshipful Company of Lightmongers (electric lighting suppliers)
Worshipful Company of Environmental Cleaners
Worshipful Company of Chartered Architects
Worshipful Company of Constructors
Worshipful Company of Information Technologists
Worshipful Company of World Traders
Worshipful Company of Water Conservators
Worshipful Company of Firefighters
Worshipful Company of Hackney Carriage Drivers (licensed taxicab drivers)
Worshipful Company of Management Consultants
Worshipful Company of International Bankers
Worshipful Company of Tax Advisers
Worshipful Company of Security Professionals
Worshipful Company of Educators
Worshipful Company of Arts Scholars

Notes

Coats of arms of the Great XII Companies

City companies without grant of livery

Company without Livery is a status which applies during the period between when a guild is recognised by the Court of Aldermen and when it is granted the rights of a livery. A guild initially applies to be a London Guild, and may later apply to the Court to become a Company of the City of London. After an indefinite period, such a Company of the City of London can apply to the Aldermen for livery status; if granted, they can thereafter use the honorific prefix Worshipful Company.

 Company of Nurses (recognised as a City Company in 2020)
 Company of Entrepreneurs (recognised as a City Company in 2020)
 Company of Communicators (recognised as a City Company in 2022)

Guilds and companies aiming to obtain the grant of Livery

 Guild of Human Resource Professionals
 Guild of Investment Managers

Other companies

 Worshipful Company of Parish Clerks
 Company of Watermen and Lightermen

Neither the Company of Parish Clerks nor the Company of Watermen have applied or intend to apply for livery status, which remains a long-standing City tradition. This is granted by the City Corporation in effect to control a company. The Watermen and Parish Clerks are governed by statutes and royal charters with responsibilities outside the city. The Company of Watermen and Lightermen was established by Act of Parliament in 1555 to regulate the watermen on the River Thames responsible for the movement of goods and passengers and remains the only ancient City guild to be formed and governed by Act of Parliament. They are then strictly not 'companies without livery' at all but simply 'companies'.

The Ward Beadles of the City of London are the elected officials, not representatives, of the City wards so have constitutional standing. They are associated together for mainly communications and social activities; they are a corps rather than a guild.

The City Livery Club, the Guild of Young Freemen and the Guild of Freemen of the City of London, whilst not being livery companies, are popular clubs amongst the freemen of the City.

The Honourable Company of Freemen of the City of London of North America (headquartered in Toronto, Ontario, Canada) represents Freemen and Liverymen of the City of London who reside in North America.

The Southwark Manors
The City Corporation of London remains lord of three manors at Southwark (Guildable, King's and Great Liberty). These are membership organisations for those areas which are the jurors of their manorial courts. They are not in any way guilds as are not related to trading and occupational activities. These courts retain legal-standing under the Administration of Justice Act 1977.

Gallery

See also
 List of guilds in the United Kingdom
 Incorporated Trades of Edinburgh
 Mottos and halls of the Livery Companies
 Zünfte of Zürich
 Six corps de marchands of Paris
 Cinco Gremios Mayores of Madrid

References

Further reading
 
 Robert Seymour Of the Other Companies Following the Twelve
 
 Account of the Companies of the City of London, Alphabetically Arranged, pages 376–429
 Edward Mayer and Donald Adamson, The Curriers' Company: A Modern History, 2000.

External links

 Records of London's Livery Companies Online

City of London
Corporatism
Guilds in England
History of the City of London
Local government in London